Abi foq al-Shagara (My Father Up on the Tree), is a 1969 Egyptian drama musical romantic film directed by Hussein Kamal and produced by Abdel Halim Hafez for Sawt al-Fann. The film stars Abdel Halim Hafez and Nadia Lutfi in lead roles where as Mervat Amin, Jenita Furneau, Samir Sabri and Salah Nazmi made supportive roles.

The film has been shot in and around Alexandria, Egypt. The film became a blockbuster of that year particularly due to many kissing scenes. The film is considered one of the best films ever made in Egypt. It was the final film appearance by lead actor Abdel Halim Hafez before his death on March 30, 1977 due to liver failure as a complication from Schistosoma mansoni.

Plot

Cast
 Abdel Halim Hafez as Adel
 Nadia Lutfi as Firdaus
 Mervat Amin as Amaal
 Samir Sabri as Ashraf
 Salah Nazmi as Khamis
 Amira as Ahlam
 Nabila El Sayed		
 Imad Hamdi as Kamal
 Hamed Morsi as Abdel Mawjood
 Mahmoud Rashad		
 Nahed Samir

References

External links
 
 Abi foq al-Shagara on YouTube

1969 films
Egyptian drama films
1969 drama films
1960s Arabic-language films